Matilde Paoletti (born 4 March 2003) is an Italian tennis player.

Paoletti has a career-high WTA ranking of 297 in singles achieved on 13 February 2023. She also has a career-high WTA ranking of 987 in doubles achieved on 18 July 2022.

Career 
Paoletti made her WTA Tour main-draw debut at the 2021 Internazionali Femminili di Palermo in the doubles draw. Her first singles tour-level match was at the same tournament one year later.

ITF Circuit finals

Singles: 1 (title)

Doubles: 3 (2 titles, 1 runner–ups)

Notes

References

External links
 

2003 births
Living people
Italian female tennis players